Casal do Abade is a small village located near the border between Tábua and Oliveira do Hospital, Portugal. Casal do Abade has around 100 inhabitants. The main place of interest  is Fonte Velha (Old Fountain), built by Romans.

External links 
 Fonte Velha

Villages in Portugal